Madan-e Qol Qolu (also Romanized as Ma‘dan-e Qol Qolū) is a village in Soghan Rural District, Soghan District, Arzuiyeh County, Kerman Province, Iran. At the 2006 census, its population was 82 citizen, in 27 families.

References 

Populated places in Arzuiyeh County